The Nămolești is a right tributary of the Danube in Romania. It flows into the Danube near Gârliciu.

References

Rivers of Romania
Rivers of Tulcea County
Rivers of Constanța County